Luella is an unincorporated community in Henry County, in the U.S. state of Georgia.

History
A post office called Luella was established in 1887, and remained in operation until 1955. The community was named after the daughter of a railroad official.

The Georgia General Assembly incorporated Luella as a town in 1912. The town's municipal charter was repealed in 1995.

References

Former municipalities in Georgia (U.S. state)
Unincorporated communities in Henry County, Georgia
Populated places disestablished in 1995